The Li Family Historical Residence is a historical house in Gushan District, Kaohsiung, Taiwan.

History
The building was constructed in 1931 by Li Rong, the seventh generation descendant of the Li clan who migrated from Zhejiang to Taiwan.

Architecture
The residence is a 2-story building designed with Baroque architecture style and a mixture of Western and oriental style. It has a symmetrical building layout design. The main hall and porch are located at the center of the building surrounded by arcade. Fences surrounding the building are tile-covered and the facade is stone-washed concrete.

See also
 List of tourist attractions in Taiwan

References

1931 establishments in Taiwan
Baroque architecture in Kaohsiung
Buildings and structures in Kaohsiung
Houses completed in 1931
Houses in Taiwan
Tourist attractions in Kaohsiung